Shabrak may refer to:
Ahmadabad-e Shahrak
Shahrak-e Pain